Portuguese verbs display a high degree of inflection. A typical regular verb has over fifty different forms, expressing up to six different grammatical tenses and three moods. Two forms are peculiar to Portuguese within the Romance languages:
 The personal infinitive, a non-finite form which does not show tense, but is inflected for person and number.
 The future subjunctive, is sometimes archaic in some dialects (including peninsular) of related languages such as Spanish, but still active in Portuguese.

It has also several verbal periphrases.

Overview
Portuguese verbs have the following properties.

 Two numbers—singular, plural
 Three persons—first, second, third
 Three aspects—perfective, imperfective, progressive*
 Two voices—active, passive*
 Six morphological forms for tenses, aspects, and/or moods—present, preterite, imperfect, pluperfect, future, and conditional.
 Three (or four) moods—indicative, subjunctive, imperative (and conditional, according to some authors)

Classes with an asterisk are entirely periphrastic. The passive voice can be constructed in two different ways. The pluperfect and the future of the indicative mood, as well as the conditional form, are often replaced with other verbal constructions or verbal periphrases in the spoken language.

Basic tenses and moods
Conjugation is demonstrated here with the important irregular verb fazer, "to do":

Periphrastic forms are as follows:

Notes

Description

The tenses correspond to:
 Present (presente): "I do" or "I am doing".
 Preterite (pretérito, or pretérito perfeito): "I did" or "I have done".
 Imperfect (imperfeito, or pretérito imperfeito): "I did", "I used to do", "I was doing".
 Pluperfect (mais-que-perfeito, or pretérito mais-que-perfeito): "I had done".
 Future (futuro, or futuro do presente in Brazilian Portuguese): "I will do", "I am going to do".
 Conditional (condicional, or futuro do pretérito in Brazilian Portuguese): "I would do". Used in some types of conditional sentences, as a form of courtesy, or as a future-in-the-past.

The five non-finite forms generally correspond to:
 (Impersonal) infinitive (infinitivo, or infinitivo impessoal): equivalent to English "to do".
 Past participle (particípio, or particípio passado): equivalent to English "done".
 Present participle (particípio presente): Uncommon in modern speech. Somewhat equivalent to English "doer", or used as an adjective relating to an ongoing action, or that action in general. For example, "falante" can mean "talking (+ noun)", "talkative" or "speaker". See notes above.
 Gerund (gerúndio): equivalent to English "(is) doing". Used to actually show/describe  ongoing action.
 Personal infinitive (infinitivo pessoal): "(for me) to do", an infinitive which inflects according to its subject; a rare feature that Portuguese shares with Galician.

The moods are used roughly as follows:
 Indicative (indicativo): for factual statements or positive beliefs. Example of an English equivalent: "I have done".
 Subjunctive (subjuntivo, or conjuntivo): mostly used when speaking of unreal, uncertain, or unassumed conditions: "Were I to do".
 Imperative (imperativo): for direct commands or requests; equivalent to the English "Do!"

For the Portuguese personal pronouns (which are omitted whenever they can be inferred from the ending of the conjugated verb or the context), see Portuguese personal pronouns and possessives.

Conjugations
Regular verbs belong to one of three conjugation classes, distinguished by the ending of their infinitive forms (which is also their citation form):
 Those whose infinitive ends in -ar belong to the first conjugation (e.g. lavar, matar, ladrar);
 Those whose infinitive ends in -er belong to the second conjugation (e.g. correr, comer, colher);
 Those whose infinitive ends in -ir belong to the third conjugation (e.g. partir, destruir, urdir);
The verb pôr is conventionally placed in the second conjugation by many authors, since it is derived from Old Portuguese poer (Latin ponere). In any event, this is an irregular verb whose conjugation must be learned on its own. Other verbs with infinitives ending in -or, such as depor, compor, and propor are derivatives of pôr, and are conjugated in the same way.

First conjugation (cantar)

Second conjugation (comer)

Third conjugation (partir)

Quick reference

Important irregular verbs
The following irregular verbs are used as auxiliary verbs in various periphrastic constructions.

ter – to have

estar – to be

ser – to be

haver – to have, to happen, there to be

pôr - to put

Conditional and future
There are few irregular verbs for these tenses (only dizer, fazer, trazer, and their compounds – also haver, ter, ser, ir, pôr, estar, etc. – for the subjunctive future imperfect). The indicative future imperfect, conditional, and subjunctive future imperfect are formed by adding to the infinitive of the verb the indicative present inflections of the auxiliary verb haver (dropping the h and av), the 2nd/3rd conjugation endings of the preterite, imperfect, and the personal infinitive endings, respectively. Thus, for the majority of verbs, the simple personal infinitive coincides with subjunctive future.

Imperative
The affirmative imperative for second person pronouns tu and vós is obtained from the present indicative, by deletion of the final -s (in some cases, an accent mark must be added to the vowel which precedes it). For other persons, and for negative clauses, the present subjunctive takes the role of imperative.

Pronunciation of present inflections
In the present tense, the stress fluctuates between the root and the termination. Other vowels (u, i) and nasalized vowels (before closed syllables) stay unchanged, as well as the verbs with the diphthongs -ei, -eu, -oi, -ou; they always keep a closed-mid pronunciation; e.g. deixo  (deixar), endeuso  (endeusar), açoito  (açoitar), roubo  (roubar), etc. Alternation in stem-stressed forms is blocked when a nasal consonant (or ) follows, in which case the higher alternant (i.e. ,  or ) is used in all forms. For example, in the verb comer, all of the forms como, comes, come, comem have .

Example: Consider the conjugation of correr (analogous to comer, presented above) in the Indicative Present Simple. The first-person singular corro has  in the stressed vowel, while other forms corres, corre, correm have .

This also has repercussions in the imperative and present subjunctive, for their inflections are constructed from the indicative present simple and indicative present simple in the 1st singular person respectively.

Verbs pelar, amar and rendar

Verbs correr, temer and vender

Verbs dormir, banir and sentir

See also
 Portuguese grammar
 Portuguese personal pronouns and possessives
 Portuguese phonology
 Wikibooks: Variation of the Portuguese Verbs

References

External links

 Conjugate.click, conjugation of Portuguese verbs, features include hiding/unhiding tu/vós forms which only used is some regions of Brazil, clear-human voice annunciation for most infinitive forms of the verb, illustrations for better retention, etc.
 Online Portuguese Verb Conjugator, fast and simple verb conjugator with irregular forms highlighting.
 Conjugation paradigm for Portuguese regular verbs, at Orbis Latinus
 LX-Conjugator Online conjugator with support for pronominal conjugation (up to three clitics)
 Conjuga-me A very complete online conjugator for Portuguese
 Verb ConjugationTrainer by Tudo Bem Portuguese Web app for memorizing Portuguese verb conjugations

Verb conjugation, Portuguese
Indo-European verbs